KOKK (1210 AM, "Dakota Country") is a radio station licensed to serve Huron, South Dakota.  The station is owned by Riverfront Broadcasting, LLC. It airs a full-service country music format. It has changed its frequency since signing on the air. It was previously at 1190 AM.

The station was assigned these call letters by the Federal Communications Commission.

Programming
In addition to its usual Country music programming, KOKK airs local news, market updates, ABC News updates, Paul Harvey news and commentary, live sports coverage of area high schools, Minnesota Twins baseball, and both Sunday and Monday NFL football games.  The station's motto is "KOKK - the station that grows on you."

Ownership
Dakota Communications has operated KOKK since 1975. It is the licensee of all four FCC-licensed radio stations in Huron.

References

External links
KOKK official website

OKK
Country radio stations in the United States
Full service radio stations in the United States
Radio stations established in 1974
Huron, South Dakota
Beadle County, South Dakota
Mass media in the Mitchell, South Dakota micropolitan area
1974 establishments in South Dakota